GDHS may refer to:
 Georgetown District High School, Georgetown, Ontario, Canada
 Glengarry District High School, Alexandria, Ontario, Canada
 Groton-Dunstable Regional High School, Groton, Massachusetts, United States